The Kesh temple hymn, Liturgy to Nintud, or Liturgy to Nintud on the creation of man and woman, is a Sumerian tablet, written on clay tablets as early as 2600 BCE. Along with the Instructions of Shuruppak, it is the oldest surviving literature in the world.

Compilation

Fragments of the text were discovered in the University of Pennsylvania Museum of Archaeology and Anthropology catalogue of the Babylonian section (CBS) from their excavations at the temple library at Nippur in modern day Iraq. One fragment of the text found on CBS tablet number 11876 was first published by Hugo Radau in "Miscellaneous Sumerian Texts," number 8 in 1909. Radau's fragment was translated by Stephen Herbert Langdon in 1915. Langdon published a translation from a  perforated, four sided, Sumerian prism from Nippur and held in the Ashmolean in Oxford in 1913 (number 1911-405) in "Babylonian Liturgies." The prism contains around 145 lines in eight sections, similar to the Hymn to Enlil. Langdon called it "A Liturgy to Nintud, Goddess of Creation" and noted that each section ended with the same refrain, which he interpreted as referring "to the creation of man and woman, the Biblical Adam and Eve." Langdon translated two further fragments in 1914 and 1917.

Barton's tablet contained nine sections from which he was able to translate sections four, five and six. Barton argued for the abandonment of the myth's subtitle, the "creation of man." He claimed, "So far as the writer can see, there is no allusion in the text to the creation of man." He notes only the allusion to the goddess he called Nintu as "the mother of mankind." He suggested, "Apparently the text celebrated the primitive (or very early) conditions of some town; possibly the founding and growth of the town, but beyond this we can confidently affirm nothing."

CBS tablet 6520 was published in 1929 by Edward Chiera in "Sumerian Lexical Texts". Chiera also published three more tablets—CBS 7802, CBS 13625 and CBS 14153—in "Sumerian Epics and Myths". Other translations were made from tablets in the Nippur collection of the Museum of the Ancient Orient in Istanbul (Ni). Chiera translated number Ni 2402 in "Sumerian Religious Texts" in 1924. Hermann Volrath Hilprecht and Samuel Noah Kramer amongst others worked to translate several others from the Istanbul collection including Ni 4371, 4465, 4555 & 9773, 4597, 9649, 9810, 9861 & 9903. A further tablet source of the myth is held by the Louvre in Paris, number AO 6717. Others are held in the Ashmolean number 1929-478, British Museum number 115798 and the Walters Art Museum number 48.1802, formerly called the "David prism". Further tablets containing the text were excavated at Isin, modern Ishan al-Bahriyat. More were found at Henri de Genouillac's excavations at Kish (B 150) and Jean Perrot's excavations at Susa. Sir Charles Leonard Woolley unearthed more tablets at Ur contained in the "Ur excavations texts" from 1928. Other tablets and versions were used to bring the myth to its present form with the latest composite text by Miguel Civil produced in 1992 with latest translation by Gene Gragg in 1969 and Joachim Krecher in 1966. Gragg described the text as "one of the best preserved literary texts that we possess from the Old Babylonian period".

Robert D. Biggs translated an exceptionally archaic version of the hymn from Tell Abu Salabikh. He dated this version to around 2600 BCE based upon similarities to tablets found in Shuruppak and dated to a similar age by Anton Deimer in the 1920s. Subsequent radiocarbon dating of samples taken from Tell Abu Salabikh date the site to 2550-2520 BCE however, a timeframe slightly more recent than the one Biggs proposed. Biggs recognized various differences in the archaic cuneiform and that "the literary texts of this period were unrecognized for so long is due to the fact that they present formidable obstacles to comprehension". He suggests that Abu Salabikh could have been the location of Kesh, however points out that it is not near Adab as described and that Kesh could have just been a variation in the spelling of Kish. He discusses how the hymn is preserved for so long in later Nippur texts, saying "Although the Abu Saläbikh copies are approximately eight centuries earlier than copies known before, there is a surprisingly small amount of deviation (except in orthography) between them. The Old Babylonian version is thus not a creation of Old Babylonian scribes using older material, but is a faithful reflection of a text that had already been fixed in the Sumerian literary tradition for centuries." Biggs suggested "that other traditional works of literature may also go back in essentially their present form to the last third of the third millennium BCE at least."

Composition

Victor Hurowitz referred to it as the "Kesh Temple building hymn" and suggests the hymn begins with a description and Enlil praising the city Kesh and its selection and establishment of the Ekur by Enlil. He also discusses the writing of the hymn by another god called Nisaba. Sabrina P. Ramet commented on the presence and role of Nisaba (or Nidaba) in the establishment of the temple. She refers to her as the "goddess of vegetation, writing and literature including astronomical texts, the deity of the "house of understanding" (most likely intelligence), and as she who 'knows the (inmost) secrets of numbers'." Nisaba records the events and provides a "standard version" of the events as they really happened. Charpin and Todd noted in the relationship between Enlil and Nisuba (similar to Yahweh and Moses) how the text is the work of gods, who created and transmitted it to humans, giving the literature a reason for legitimacy.

The myth goes on to describe the temple dedication rites and explains that the Annanuki were the lords of the temple. He suggests that the hymn mentions "objects placed in the temple upon its completion." His translation of the introduction reads:

The hymn is composed of 134 lines, formally divided into eight songs or "houses" or "temples", each of which ends with three rhetorical questions discussing the birth of Nintud's warrior son, Acgi:

Lines one to twenty one describe the election and praise of Kesh as recorded by Nisaba, twenty two to forty four liken the temple to the moon against the sky containing the life sources of Sumer and its cosmic dimensions filling the world. Lines forty five to fifty seven give a metaphorical description of the temple reaching both for the heaven and descending into the underworld. Lines fifty eight to seventy three discuss the complexities of the temple with vast quantities of oxen and sheep. The temple is likened to the trees from which wood was used in its construction. The gods and functions of the temple are described and praised during temple dedication with different parts of the temple described: its interior and exterior appearance, its gate, courtyard, door and walls. The hymn ends on the conclusion to approach the temple.

Wayne Horowitz working from Gragg's translation, discusses the mention of the Abzu in the myth saying it "occurs as a name for the cosmic waters of the water table beneath the earth's surface in Sumerian literature."

The latest translation describes its founders, geography and features:

Barton translated the actions of the Annanuki in and around the temple:

Jeremy Black suggests the hymn describes the statues of bulls or lions that were placed at the entrances to temples "Kesh temple, <before which> (something) in the shape of winged lions stands, (something) in the shape of 'white' wild bulls stands facing the desert." The hymn discusses music being played at the temple towards the end with drums and the coarse sound of a bull's horn sounding at temple ceremonies: "the wild bull's horn was made to growl, the algarsura instrument was made to thud." Samuel Noah Kramer suggested that the musical instruments mentioned in the hymn were played in accompaniment. He proposed that the tigi was probably a hymn accompanied by lyre, that irshemma was perhaps one accompanied by a type of drum and that adab possibly a hymn accompanied by another form of string instrument.

The hymn finishes with an admonition repeated four times suggested to be both a warning and invocation of the divine presence in the temple. Such ambivalence about approaching temples has crucially influenced the development of Jewish and Christian mysticism.

A.R. George suggests such hymns "can be incorporated into longer compositions, as with the eulogy to Nippur and Ekur which makes up a large portion of a well-known Hymn to Enlil and the hymn to temples in Ur that introduces a Shulgi hymn."

Discussion

Stephen Langdon suggested the hymn gave evidence of the Sumerian theological view that Enlil and Ninlil created mankind and living things. He noted that Nintud, the primary goddess of Kesh was "a form of Ninlil in Nippur : in other words she is Ninlil of Kesh, where her character as goddess of begetting was emphasized." He noted based on an observation of Theophilus G. Pinches, that Ninlil or Belit Ilani had seven different names (such as Nintud, Ninhursag, Ninmah, etc.) for seven different localities. He also discussed the location of Kesh appearing to be near Kish to the east of Babylon calling the temple of Kesh "Ekisigga". Raymond de Hoop noted similarities between Sumerian temple hymns and chapter forty nine of Genesis in the Bible. He suggests remarkably close syntactical and metaphorical parallels in the sayings about Joseph and Judah such as "the highly esteemed prince, "a leopard, who seizes prey", "a great wild ox / a wild bull" and " seed of a (the) steer, engendered by a wild ox. Jeremy Black noted that Kesh was no longer a major settlement by the time of the later Babylonian versions but presumed that the temple of Nintud still functioned. Wilfred G. Lambert noted that many kings had built temples and chapels to Ninhursag, but that the Kesh sanctuary "was the centre of the goddess's cult from the Early Dynastic period into the Old Babylonian Dynasty; after this time it lost its importance".

See also
 Barton Cylinder
 Debate between Winter and Summer
 Debate between sheep and grain
 Enlil and Ninlil
 Old Babylonian oracle
 Self-praise of Shulgi (Shulgi D)
 Hymn to Enlil
 Lament for Ur
 Sumerian creation myth
 Sumerian religion
 Sumerian literature

References

Further reading
 Ansky, S.. "Hymn to Kesh". The Harps that Once..., edited by David G. Roskies, New Haven: Yale University Press, 1992, pp. 377-385
 Römer, Willem H.P., Die Klage über die Zerstörung von Ur aoat 309, Münster: Ugarit, p. 97,  2004.
 Biggs, Robert D., "An Archaic Sumerian version of the Kesh Temple Hymn from Tell Abū (S)alābīkh". In Zeitschrift für Assyriologie 61. 193-207, 1971.
 Gragg, Gene B., "The Keš Temple Hymn". In The Collection of the Sumerian Temple Hymns. Texts from Cuneiform Sources III. Sjöberg, Åke W., Bergmann, E., and Gragg, Gene B. (ed). Locust Valley, New York: J.J. Augustin. 155-189,  1969.
 Jacobsen, Thorkild., The Harps that Once .. Sumerian Poetry in Translation. New Haven/London: Yale University Press. 151-166,  1987.
 Wilcke, Claus., "Die Inschriftenfunde der 7. und 8. Kampagnen (1983 und 1984)". In Isin-Išān Bahrīyāt III: Die Ergebnisse der Ausgrabungen 1983-1984. Bayerische Akademie der Wissenschaften, Philosophisch-historische Klasse, Abhandlungen Neue Folge, 84. Hrouda, Barthel (ed). München: Verlag der Bayerischen Akademie der Wissenschaften. 83-120, 1987.
 Geller, M.J., "Jabosen's "Harps" and the Keš Temple Hymn". In Zeitschrift für Assyriologie 86. 68-79, 1996.

External links
 Barton, George Aaron., Miscellaneous Babylonian Inscriptions, Yale University Press, 1918. Online Version
 Cheira, Edward., Sumerian Epics and Myths, University of Chicago, Oriental Institute Publications, 1934. Online Version
 Chirea, Edward., Sumerian Religious Texts, Constantinople. Musée impérial ottoman, 1924. Online Version
 Langdon, Stephen., Babylonian Liturgies. Museum of the University of Pennsylvania, 1919. Online Version
 Biggs, Robert D., Zeitschrift für Assyriologie und Vorderasiatische, Archäologie , Volume 61 (2), de Gruyter – Jan 1, 1971 - Springerprotocols
 The Keš temple hymn., Black, J.A., Cunningham, G., Robson, E., and Zólyomi, G., The Electronic Text Corpus of Sumerian Literature, Oxford 1998-.
 ETCSLtransliteration : c.5.3.2
 Cuneiform Digital Library Initiative - CBS 8384
 The Walters Art Museum, Accession Number: 48.1802, Hymn to Kesh (with high resolution photo) 

26th-century BC works
3rd-millennium BC literature
1909 archaeological discoveries
Sumerian literature
Clay tablets
Mesopotamian myths
Mythological mountains
Creation myths
Religious cosmologies
Comparative mythology
Hymns